The Amos Learned Farm is a historic farmstead on New Hampshire Route 137 (Lower Jaffrey Road) in Dublin, New Hampshire.  This -story wood frame Cape style house was built c. 1808 by Benjamin Learned, Jr., son of one of Dublin's early settlers, and is a well-preserved example of a period hill farmstead.  The property was listed on the National Register of Historic Places in 1983.

Description and history
It is a -story wood-frame structure, with a gabled roof, central chimney, and clapboarded exterior. Its main facade is oriented facing south, presenting a side gable to the street. Windows are placed irregularly, with a center entrance on the south facade.

The house was built about 1808 by Benjamin Learned Jr; he deeded the property to his brother Amos that year.  Both of the Learneds eventually moved to Maine.  The house stands near a discontinued road that went to the Upper Jaffrey Road, where their father's house also still stands.  Later owners of the property include Irish and Finnish immigrants, representatives of a broadening of the population demographics of Dublin in the early 20th century.

See also
National Register of Historic Places listings in Cheshire County, New Hampshire

References

Houses on the National Register of Historic Places in New Hampshire
Houses completed in 1808
Houses in Dublin, New Hampshire
National Register of Historic Places in Dublin, New Hampshire